Kangiqsualujjuaq is an Inuit village located at the mouth of the George River on the east coast of Ungava Bay in Nunavik, Quebec, Canada. Its population was 956 as of the 2021 census.

Names
The settlement's original name, Fort Severight, honoured John Severight, a North West Company man who had headed Fort Coulonge during McLean's time there. After its reestablishment, it was variously known from its location as Fort George, George's River, George River, George River Post, and Fort George River.

The name "Kangiqsualujjuaq" is Inuktitut for "the very large bay". It is also sometimes spelled "Kangirsualujjuaq".

Geography
Enveloped by mountains, the township is framed by picturesque surroundings and its elevated position affords unobstructed views of the George River. The town itself is laid out on a grid pattern over levelled-ground, with two unsealed roads leading a few kilometres beyond the mountain ridges at either end of the village. Amidst rocky outcrops and stone way-finding markers (Inukshuk), the village landscape is dotted with stands of stunted trees and prostrate groundcover that clings perilously to the rugged granite terrain. In low-lying areas, the ground is covered by thick carpets of moss and lichen.

History

John McLean established Fort Severight for the Hudson's Bay Company in 1838. It served as a salmon and seal fishery, supplying Fort Chimo to the west and Fort Trial and Fort Nascopie to the south. It was abandoned in 1842 after Fort Chimo turned out to be an unprofitable station and a path was found to supply Nascopie from Fort Smith to the southeast.

The site was taken up again in September 1876, mostly to capture the local indigenous peoples' trade which had been going to the Moravians. The new buildings were built from the old. The site abandoned again in the summer of 1878 before reopening again in 1883. It again functioned as a salmon and seal fishery for Fort Chimo, although it carried on some local trading until that was removed to Port Burwell in 1917. HBC shuttered its office in June 1952.

In 1959, local Inuit established, on their own initiative, the first co-operative in Northern Quebec for the purpose of marketing Arctic char. Construction of the village began in 1962 and Inuit began to settle there permanently. In 1963 a school, a co-operative store, and government buildings were built. In 1980, Kangiqsualujjuaq was legally established as a municipality.

The community was stricken by an avalanche in the early morning of January 1, 1999, which destroyed the Satuumavik School gymnasium during New Year celebrations, killing nine. Another 25 people were injured, 12 of them seriously enough to have to be airlifted  to Montreal for treatment. Some speculated that it may have been triggered by lively dancing at the party. The school was rebuilt on the new, safer location and renamed to Ulluriaq School.

Demographics 

Economy
Industries in Kangiqsualujjuaq include hunting of caribou, seal and beluga whale, Arctic char fishing, and the production of Inuit art. The town is also the main terminus of the George River canoeing expeditions (e.g. one of Chewonki Foundation's canoe trips).

Government
The police services are provided by the Kativik Regional Police Force. The Kativik School Board formerly operated the Ulluriaq School, previously the Satuumavik School.

Transportation

The town is served by the small Kangiqsualujjuaq Airport. Journeys across the Torngat Mountains by snowmobile to the Labrador settlements Nain and Nachvak are rarely embarked upon these days, but were commonplace when dog teams were used. Cargo ships from Montreal deliver cumbersome supplies and equipment to the community every summer.

Notable people
 Mary Simon (Ningiukadluk), 30th Governor General of Canada
 Donat Savoie

Inuit elders from Kangiqsualujjuaq include:
 Noah Angnatuk
 George Annanack
 Johnny Sam Annanack
 Maggie Annanack (Elsie Imaq)
 Sarah Annanack
 Willie Emudluk
 Tivi Etok
 Willie Etok
 Benjamin Jararuse

Explorers and missionaries who have visited the town include:
 Mina Benson Hubbard
 George Kmoch
 Benjamin Gottlieb Kohlmeister
 Albert Peter Low
 John McLean

Images

References

External links 

Kativik Regional Government
Nunavik tourism - Kangiqsualujjuaq website
Kangiqsualujjuaq, Quebec Statistics Canada
Ulluriaq School, Kangiqsualujjuaq
Inuit Knowledge and Perceptions of the Land-Water Interface, a comprehensive study of the Kangiqsualujjuaq people and their knowledge and perceptions of their homelands by Scott Heyes (2007)
Schooling the North

Populated coastal places in Canada
Inuit communities in Quebec
Road-inaccessible communities of Quebec